"Get Down" is a song by Irish singer-songwriter Gilbert O'Sullivan, from his 1973 album I'm a Writer, Not a Fighter. Released as a single, it spent two weeks at the top of the UK Singles Chart in April 1973, was also a number-one hit in Ireland and was a top-ten hit in the United States and Canada. The song was originally used by O'Sullivan as a piano warm-up tune, but was eventually extended into a full song and released as a single; O'Sullivan recorded and released the song as a change from his more melancholy pieces.

Believed to be an order from O'Sullivan to his dog ("Get Down!"), the singer is actually referring to a girl in the song behaving as a dog jumping on him, hence the request to "get down".

In 2006 British dance group Malibu Sneakers recorded a dance version of the song entitled "Get Down Again". In 2008 it was released as a vinyl 12", including a vocal remix by Raul Rincon.

The song was used in the 2013 film The Harry Hill Movie.

According to Rick Finch of KC and the Sunshine Band, the song was the inspiration for the 1975 disco hit "Get Down Tonight".

Chart performance

Weekly singles charts

Year-end charts

Maison Ikkoku
This song, along with another one of O'Sullivan's songs, "Alone Again (Naturally)", were featured as the opening and ending for episode 24 of the Japanese anime hit Maison Ikkoku. At the time, O'Sullivan was signed to production company Kitty Film's associated record label, Kitty Records, which wanted to use the anime's popularity as a way to promote the singer's career in Japan.  According to series director Kazuo Yamazaki, the reason the songs were dropped after only one episode was that they were unpopular with viewers; due to copyright issues, they were not included on the English-language American release of the anime, replaced by the previously used Japanese theme songs.  The anime was based upon the popular manga of the same name by Rumiko Takahashi.

References

1973 singles
Gilbert O'Sullivan songs
UK Singles Chart number-one singles
Irish Singles Chart number-one singles
Songs written by Gilbert O'Sullivan
MAM Records singles
1973 songs